The 2017–18 curling season began in May 2017 and ended in May 2018.

Note: In events with two genders, the men's tournament winners will be listed before the women's tournament winners.

Curling Canada sanctioned events
This section lists events sanctioned by and/or conducted by Curling Canada. The following events in bold have been confirmed by Curling Canada as are part of the 2017–18 Season of Champions programme.

Other events
Note: Events that have not been placed on Curling Canada's list of sanctioned events are listed here. If an event is listed on Curling Canada's final list for the 2017–18 curling season, it will be moved up to the "Curling Canada-sanctioned events" section.

World Curling Tour

Teams
See: List of teams on the 2017–18 World Curling Tour

''Grand Slam events in bold.

Men's events

Women's events

Mixed doubles events

WCT Order of Merit rankings

WCT Money List

Notes

References

External links
World Curling Tour Home
Season of Champions Home

2017-18
2017-18
2017-18